Dennis Schmidt may refer to:

 Dennis Schmidt (author) (1939–2003), American science fiction and fantasy author
 Dennis Schmidt (footballer) (born 1988), German footballer
 Dennis J. Schmidt, American philosopher